"Fadeless" is a maxi-single by the Japanese rock band, The Gazette. It was released on August 21, 2013 in two editions; the "Optical Impression" edition and "Auditory Impression" edition. The first edition includes two songs "Fadeless" and "Quiet", and a DVD containing the music video for the song "Fadeless". The second edition comes with a bonus track "Forbidden Beaver".

Track listing

Fadeless: Optical Impression
Disc one
 "Fadeless" - 4:05
 "Quiet" - 5:23
Disc two (DVD)
 "Fadeless: Music Clip" - 4:16

Fadeless: Auditory Impression
 "Fadeless" - 4:05
 "Quiet" - 5:23
 "Forbidden Beaver" - 3:31

Note
 The single reached a peak mark of #4 on the Japanese Oricon Weekly Charts.

References

2011 singles
The Gazette (band) songs
2011 songs
Sony Music singles